The 2005–06 season was the 104th in the history of the Western Football League.

The league champions for the ninth time in their history, and the fourth time in five seasons, were Bideford. The champions of Division One were Dawlish Town.

Final tables

Premier Division
The Premier Division was increased from 20 to 21 clubs after Bridport and Clyst Rovers were relegated to the First Division. Three clubs joined:

Calne Town, runners-up in the First Division.
Radstock Town, third in the First Division.
Willand Rovers, champions of the First Division.

First Division
The First Division was increased from 20 to 22 clubs after Calne Town, Radstock Town and Willand Rovers were promoted to the Premier Division and five clubs joined:

Bradford Town, promoted from the Wiltshire League.
Bridport, relegated from the Premier Division.
Clyst Rovers, relegated from the Premier Division.
Longwell Green Sports, promoted from the Gloucestershire County League.
Portishead, promoted from the Somerset County League.

References

2005-06
9